Downsville is a hamlet, census-designated place (CDP), and former village in the town of Colchester, Delaware County, New York, United States. The population was 617 at the 2010 census.

History
It is the site of the Downsville Bridge, a covered bridge, and the historic Union Free School. Both are listed on the National Register of Historic Places.

Downsville is named for Abel Downs, who had a tannery there. The hamlet is located on the East Branch of the Delaware River. A dam on this portion of the river, at Downsville, was completed by workers paid for by New York City in 1954, creating the Pepacton Reservoir, which is part of the New York City water supply system. The Delaware and Northern Railroad ran south of town. There was a station on Depot Street.

Downsville Central School, located on Maple Avenue, serves families from the surrounding areas, including municipalities as far away as East Branch. Downsville Central School's colors are purple and white and their mascot is the Eagle.

Geography
Downsville is located in the northern part of the town of Colchester, along Downs Brook just north of its confluence with the East Branch Delaware River. New York State Route 30 passes through the hamlet, leading southwest  to the hamlet of East Branch at NY 17, and east  along the Pepacton Reservoir to Margaretville. New York State Route 206 leads northwest from Downsville  to Walton and southeast  to NY 17 at Roscoe.

Demographics

References

External links

Old photo of Downsville

Former villages in New York (state)
Census-designated places in Delaware County, New York
Census-designated places in New York (state)
Hamlets in Delaware County, New York
Hamlets in New York (state)